Mokkoku-ike (Re)  is an earthfill dam located in Kagawa Prefecture in Japan. The dam is used for irrigation. The catchment area of the dam is 12.2 km2. The dam impounds about 5  ha of land when full and can store 449 thousand cubic meters of water. The construction of the dam was started on 1985 and completed in 1991.

See also
List of dams in Japan

References

Dams in Kagawa Prefecture